Bartoliella is a genus of trematodes in the family Opecoelidae. It consists of only one species, Bartoliella pritchardae Aken'Ova, 2003.

References

Opecoelidae
Plagiorchiida genera
Monotypic protostome genera